Saint Tanca (died 637) is the name of a sixth-century French Roman Catholic saint.

Tanca was born in Troyes, France. She was killed while defending her virginity when attacked by a servant. She is considered to be a martyr. Her cultus dates from the early 7th century. Her feast day is celebrated October 10.

References

catholic.org

External links

637 deaths
Burials at Troyes Cathedral
7th-century Christian martyrs
Year of birth unknown
Female saints of medieval France
7th-century Christian saints
7th-century Frankish women
7th-century Frankish saints
People from Troyes
7th-century Frankish people